The Hemphillia glandulosa, common name the warty jumping-slug, is a species of air-breathing land slug, a terrestrial pulmonate gastropod mollusk in the family  Arionidae.

Hemphillia glandulosa is the type species of the genus Hemphillia.

Distribution, conservation status 
It lives in British Columbia in Canada, where the Committee on the Status of Endangered Wildlife in Canada (COSEWIC) has assessed it as a species of special concern. The Canadian Species at Risk Act listed it in the List of Wildlife Species at Risk as being a species of special concern in Canada.

References

Further reading 
 COSEWIC (2003). "COSEWIC assessment and status report on the warty jumping-slug Hemphillia glandulosa in Canada". Committee on the Status of Endangered Wildlife in Canada. Ottawa. vi + 19 pp.
 (Originally issued as Management Recommendations (February 1998) Thomas E. Burke) Wainwright M. & Duncan N. (revised) (October 2005) Conservation Assessment for Four Species of the Genus Hemphillia". USDA Forest Service Region 6 and USDI Bureau of Land Management, Oregon and Washington. 33 pp.
 map of distribution of Hemphillia glandulosa in the USA

Arionidae
Gastropods described in 1872